Nuuksuq Glacier is a glacier located on the central coast of Baffin Island, Nunavut, Canada.

See also
List of glaciers

References

Glaciers of Baffin Island
Arctic Cordillera